James (Jimmy) Marr Warrender (2 April 1931 – 15 October 2012) was a former Scottish New Zealander football (soccer) player who represented New Zealand at an international level.

He was Captain of the Banks O' Dee F.C. side who won the Scottish Junior Cup in 1957, defeating Kilsyth Rangers 1–0 in the final at Hampden Park, Glasgow in front of 30,800 spectators.

Warrender played two official A-international matches for the New Zealand national football team in 1960, both against Pacific minnows Tahiti, the first a 5–1 win on 5 September, the second a 2–1 win on 12 September 1960.

References 

New Zealand association footballers
New Zealand international footballers
Association footballers not categorized by position
Scottish Junior Football Association players
1931 births
2012 deaths